Ernest Maria Müller (30 June 1822 in Jiřice u Miroslavi – 28 September 1888 in Linz) was a Czech clergyman and bishop for the Roman Catholic Diocese of Linz. He was ordained in 1846. He was appointed bishop in 1885.

References

1822 births
1888 deaths
Czech Roman Catholic bishops
People from Znojmo District